The 2020–21 Memphis Tigers men's basketball team represented the University of Memphis in the 2020–21 NCAA Division I men's basketball season. This is the 100th season of Tiger basketball, the third under head coach Penny Hardaway, and the eighth as members of the American Athletic Conference. They play their home games at the FedEx Forum. They finished the season 20-8, 11-4 to finish in 3rd place. They defeated UCF in the quarterfinals of the AAC Tournament before losing in the semifinals to Houston. They received an invitation to the NIT where they defeated Dayton, Boise State, Colorado State, and Mississippi State to become NIT Champions.

Previous season
The Tigers finished the 2019–20 season 21–10, 10–8 in AAC play to finish in sixth place. They entered as the No. 6 seed in the AAC tournament, which was ultimately cancelled due to the coronavirus pandemic.

Offseason

Departures

Incoming transfers

2020 recruiting class
 

Memphis will also add Preferred Walk-on Conor Glennon a 5'10" PG from Brother Rice High School in Chicago.

Preseason Awards
 Preseason Rookie of the Year - Moussa Cisse
 All-AAC Second Team - Landers Nolley, D.J. Jeffries

Roster

Nov 19, 2020 - Prior to the start of season, Isaiah Stokes was suspended for the year.
Dec 31, 2020 - Ahmad Rand elected to transfer to Oregon State after the fall semester.
Jan 19, 2021 - 2021 commit Jordan Nesbitt enrolled a semester early.
Jan 22, 2021 - Lance Thomas entered the transfer portal. He would eventually transfer to South Alabama.

Schedule and results

COVID-19 impact

Due to the ongoing COVID-19 pandemic, the Tigers' schedule was subject to change, including the cancellation or postponement of individual games, the cancellation of the entire season, or games played either with minimal fans or without fans in attendance and just essential personnel. The game against Houston scheduled for March 7th was moved to Houston.

Schedule

|-
!colspan=12 style=| Regular season
|-

|-
!colspan=12 style=| AAC Tournament
|-

|-
!colspan=12 style=| NIT
|-

|-

Rankings

*AP does not release post-NCAA Tournament rankings

Awards and honors

American Athletic Conference honors

All-AAC Awards
Freshman of the Year: Moussa Cisse
Sixth Man of the Year : Boogie Ellis

All-AAC First Team
Landers Nolley II

All-AAC Freshman Team
Moussa Cisse

Source

References

Memphis
Memphis Tigers men's basketball seasons
Memphis Tigers men's basketball
Memphis Tigers men's basketball
Memphis
National Invitation Tournament championship seasons